Epuraea guttata is a species of sap beetle of the subfamily Carpophilinae.

Description

Adult
The pronotum, mesonotum, and metanotum are strongly shiny. The head and legs have a moderate shine, as do the elytra. The abdomen is matte.

Pupa
Pupae range in color from whitish to cream, except for the longitudinal tubercles, which are light brown in color.

Larva

Ecology
The beetles live in groves that include the English oak. They can be found under the bark, feeding on the sap of deciduous trees. They are occasionally found in association with the larvae of stem-boring moths of genus Cossus.

References

Nitidulidae
Beetles of Europe
Beetles described in 1790